The facies of the pile dwellings and of the dammed settlements (Italian: facies delle palafitte e degli abitati arginati) is a cultural aspect of the Middle to Late Bronze Age (c. 1800 to 1300 BC) that developed between eastern Lombardy, Trentino and western Veneto. It was followed in the Final Bronze Age by the Proto-Villanovan culture and by the Luco culture.

The continuity with the previous Polada culture of the Early Bronze Age seems to be unbroken. The villages, as in the previous phase, are on stilts and they were concentrated in the area of the Lake of Garda. In the plains appeared instead villages with levees and ditches.

The bronze metallurgy (weapons, work tools, etc.) was well developed among these populations. As for the burial customs both cremation and inhumation were praticted. Sometimes the two rites coexisted in the same necropolis, as at "Olmo di Nogara".

Archaeological evidence suggests that the society was probably dominated by a warrior elite.

Gallery

See also
Prehistoric pile dwellings around the Alps

Notes

Bibliography
 Anna Maria Bietti Sestieri, L'Italia nell'età del bronzo e del ferro : dalle palafitte a Romolo (2200-700 a.C.). with CD-ROM. Rome: Carocci. 2010.  .

Archaeological cultures of Western Europe
Archaeology of Italy
Italian culture